The association football tournament at the 2016 Summer Olympics was held from 3 to 20 August in Brazil.

In addition to the Olympic host city of Rio de Janeiro, matches were played in Belo Horizonte, Brasília, Salvador, São Paulo, and Manaus. All six cities hosted matches during the 2014 World Cup, with the Estádio Olímpico João Havelange in Rio the only Olympic venue not to have been a World Cup venue.

Associations affiliated with FIFA might send teams to participate in the tournament. Men's teams were restricted to under-23 players (born on or after 1 January 1993) with a maximum of three overage players allowed, while there were no age restrictions on women's teams. The Games made use of about 400 footballs.

Competition schedule
The match schedule of the men's and women's tournament was unveiled on 10 November 2015.

Venues
Rio de Janeiro hosted preliminary matches at the Estádio Olímpico João Havelange and the women's and men's final at the Maracanã Stadium on 19 and 20 August. Apart from Rio de Janeiro the five other cities were: São Paulo, Belo Horizonte, Brasília, Salvador, and Manaus, which were all host cities during the 2014 FIFA World Cup. The final choice of venues was announced by FIFA on 16 March 2015.

Training venues

Qualification

Men's qualification
In addition to host nation Brazil, 15 men's national teams qualified from six separate continental confederations. FIFA ratified the distribution of spots at the Executive Committee meeting in March 2014.

Dates and venues are those of final tournaments (or final round of qualification tournaments), various qualification stages may precede matches at these specific venues.
Nations making their Olympic tournament debut
One match each in Colombia and United States in a two-legged tie.

Women's qualification

In addition to host nation Brazil, 11 women's national teams qualified from six separate continental confederations. FIFA ratified the distribution of spots at the Executive Committee meeting in March 2014. Most continents use specific Olympic qualifying tournaments to allocate their spots, but two use slightly different procedures.

CONMEBOL used the Copa América to determine its Olympic entrant. Because the Olympic host, Brazil, won the Copa América, the runner-up (Colombia) qualified for the Olympics.

UEFA generally uses the World Cup to determine its Olympic entrants. The top 3 finishers at the World Cup, excluding England, qualified. When multiple European teams were eliminated in the same round and this results in a tie for an Olympic qualifying spot, an Olympic Qualifying Tournament was used to break the tie. For these Games, Germany and France both reached at least the quarterfinals and thus obtained qualification spots (England also did so, but was ineligible for Olympic play). The next best finish for European teams was a four-way tie among the Netherlands, Norway, Sweden, and Switzerland, which each lost in the round of 16. Those four teams competed in a separate tournament to break that tie, won by Sweden.

Dates and venues are those of final tournaments (or final round of qualification tournaments), various qualification stages may precede matches at these specific venues.
England finished in the top three among UEFA teams in the World Cup, however England is not an IOC member and talks for them to compete as Great Britain broke down.
Nations making their Olympic tournament debut

Men's competition

The competition consisted of two stages; a group stage followed by a knockout stage.

Group stage
Teams were divided into four groups of four countries, playing each team in their group once. Three points were awarded for a victory, one for a draw. The top two teams per group qualified for the quarterfinals.

Group A

Group B

Group C

Group D

Knockout stage

Women's competition

The competition consisted of two stages; a group stage followed by a knockout stage.

Group stage
Teams were divided into three groups of four countries, playing each team in their group once. Three points were awarded for a victory, one for a draw. The top two teams per group and best two third-placed teams qualified for the quarterfinals.

Group E

Group F

Group G

Knockout stage

Medal summary

Medal table

Medalists

See also
Football 5-a-side at the 2016 Summer Paralympics
Football 7-a-side at the 2016 Summer Paralympics

References

External links

 
 
 Men's Olympic Football Tournament, Rio 2016, FIFA.com
 Women's Olympic Football Tournament, Rio 2016, FIFA.com
 Results Book – Football

 
2016
Summer Olympics
Football
2016